The Sultanate of Dawaro was a Somali Muslim Sultanate founded around the 10th century by the Jarso people, sub-clan of the Dir, centred in Hararghe.

Origins
 
The founder of Dawaro Sultanate was the Somali Jarso people belonging to the Ali Madaḥweyne branch which is a sub-clan of the Somali Dir clan. The Dir clan migrated from Dir Dhaba into Hararghe. Some Jārso along with some other Somali ʿAli Madaḥweyne Dir clans were absorbed into the Afran Qallo Barentuma confederation, Although a lot of the Jārso clan have assimilated with the Oromos, they were not ethnically Oromo and were ethnically Somali.

Conquest of Dawaro
Amda Seyon I of Ethiopia conquered many independent Muslim sultanates adjacent to his Empire during his reign. In 1329, Sulṭān Ḥaydar of Dawaro was captured and imprisoned together with his ally Sulṭān Sabir ad-Dīn Maḥamed. Despite several rebellions and a brief period when Ahmeduddin Badlay, a powerful Somali ruler of the Adal Sultanate, captured Dawaro and turned it into a vassal, expanding opportunistic Oromos took control of the land and assimilated the native Somali population due to the weakening of Adal during the Ethiopian-Adal war. Just like many Somalis in Hararghe, some of the Jarso people were also assimilated into the Oromo confederation.

Legacy
Dawaro was a major power prior to its defeat and subjugation. It was roughly equal in size, population and power to the early Ifat Sultanate according to Ibn Fadlallah al-Umari.

Sultans of Dawaro

References

Former sultanates in the medieval Horn of Africa